Elections to Calderdale Metropolitan Borough Council were held on 7 May 1998.  One third of the council was up for election and the Labour party kept overall control of the council.

After the election, the composition of the council was
Labour 28
Conservative 13
Liberal Democrats 12
Independent 1

Election result

References

1998
1998 English local elections
1990s in West Yorkshire